Navin is a surname of various origins. In some cases, it is a Hebrew surname, whose Dutch derivative is Nawijn. In other cases, the surname is derived from the Gaelic surnames Mac Cnáimhín and Ó Cnáimhín.

People with the surname

 Alireza Navin, Iranian politician
 Ampasayya Naveen, Indian novelist
 Ashwin Navin, American businessman of Indian origin
 Frank Navin, American accountant
 Hilbrand Nawijn, Dutch politician
 John P. Navin, Jr., American actor
 Richard J. Navin, American artist

Citations

References

Surnames of Irish origin
Scottish surnames
Surnames of French origin